The Thulin FA was a Swedish reconnaissance aircraft built in the late 1910s.

Design and development
The Thulin FA was a two-seat biplane with the lower wings mounted at the bottom of the fuselage. The upper wing was supported by four wing struts and two V-shaped supports from the fuselage. Only the upper wings were fitted with ailerons. The fuselage was provided with two open cockpits in tandem under the upper wing. The wheel ground was fixed with a spur spring under the height knob (??). The Type FA was alternatively equipped with floats for water operation.

Eight Type FA airframes were built, seven with the Benz Bz.III and the eighth with a Thulin D rotary engine. Three were destroyed in accidents by late 1919.

Specifications

See also

References

Biplanes
Single-engined tractor aircraft
1910s Swedish aircraft
Aircraft first flown in 1918